Abdullah Al-Dawsari  (born 23 June 1990) is a Saudi professional footballer who currently plays as a defender for Al-Sahel.

Honours

Club 
Al-Hilal
 Saudi Professional League: 2009–10, 2010–11
 Saudi Crown Prince Cup: 2009–10, 2010–11, 11–12, 2012–13

References

External links 
 

1990 births
Living people
Saudi Arabian footballers
Al Hilal SFC players
Al-Shabab FC (Riyadh) players
Al-Fateh SC players
Al-Nahda Club (Saudi Arabia) players
Al-Washm Club players
Al-Fayha FC players
Al-Shoulla FC players
Al-Sahel SC (Saudi Arabia) players
Saudi Arabia international footballers
Association football defenders
Saudi Professional League players
Saudi Second Division players
Saudi First Division League players